Långholmen Prison, officially Långholmen Central Prison, was historically one of the largest prison facilities in Sweden with more than 500 cells, located on the island of Långholmen in Stockholm. It was built 1874—1880 as the central prison of Sweden, and was temporary closed down between 1972–1975. Afterwards, Långholmens spinnhus was moved. Today the building is being used as a hotel/hostel and museum, as well as to accommodate a folk high school. Part of the prison was demolished in 1982. The prison is also noted for being the location of the last execution in Sweden, as well as the final confinement of the last prisoner sentenced to execution, prior to the abolition of capital punishment in 1921. The hostel was taken into usage in May 1989.

The island itself was originally rocky and barren, but in the 19th century, the prisoners were made to cover the island with mud dredged from the waterways around it. After a few years, the fertile soil had turned  the island into a lush garden with a somewhat exotic flora compared to its surroundings, caused by various seeds accidentally brought and spread by the trade and merchant ships from other places and countries that passed by the island. This peculiarity still persists, and today the island is known as a lush oasis.

Notable prisoners
Barbro Alving
Johan Alfred Ander
Jan Guillou
Mohammed Beck Hadjetlaché
Zeth Höglund
Ture Nerman

References

External links

Långholmen Prison Museum

1874 establishments in Sweden
Defunct prisons in Sweden
Buildings and structures in Stockholm
Museums in Stockholm
Prison museums in Europe
1975 disestablishments in Sweden